This article provides a list of films produced in Hong Kong in 1972:.

1972

References

External links
 IMDB list of Hong Kong films
 Hong Kong films of 1972 at HKcinemamagic.com

1972
Lists of 1972 films by country or language
1972 in Hong Kong